Moca is a genus of moths in the family Immidae. The genus was erected by Francis Walker in 1863.

Species

Selected former species

References

External links
 

Immidae
Moth genera